Marcia Ranglin-Vassell (born 1960) is an American politician and Democratic member of the Rhode Island House of Representatives, representing the 5th District since being elected in November 2016. This district includes the Charles, Wanskuck and Elmhurst neighborhoods of the city of Providence. She is also an English language arts and special education teacher at E-Cubed Academy. She is the published author of Journeys, a collection of poems about faith, life, love and determination.

She is a member of the House Committee on Environment and Natural Resources. Her top priorities are a $15 an hour minimum wage, shifting spending from prisons to education, and decreasing gun violence. She is pro-choice.

Elections

2016 
Ranglin-Vassell ran to represent the 5th District in the Rhode Island House of Representatives in the Democratic Primary on September 13, 2016 against the incumbent, John DeSimone, the Majority Leader of the Rhode Island House of Representatives. She was supported by the Rhode Island Working Families Party as a more progressive candidate. She received 682 votes to DeSimone's 661 and received the nomination by the Democratic Party. She then won the General election on November 8, 2016 against Republican candidate Roland Joseph Lavallee and a write-in campaign by DeSimone with 2,460 (60.9%) votes.

2018 
Ranglin-Vassell ran against Holly Taylor Coolman in the Democratic Primary on September 12, 2018. She was not endorsed by the Democratic Party, despite being the incumbent, possibly due to her pro-choice position on abortion. She won the primary with 62.3% of the vote. In the November 6, 2018 General election, she won 2,572 (93.2%) votes against 188 (6.8%) write-in votes.

2020 
Ranglin-Vassell ran against Republican Ronald Iacobbo in the general election for Rhode Island House of Representatives District 5 on November 3, 2020. She won 2981 (73.8%) votes against 1027	(25.4%) votes for Iacobbo.

References 

American politicians of Jamaican descent
21st-century American women politicians
21st-century American politicians
Women state legislators in Rhode Island
Democratic Party members of the Rhode Island House of Representatives
Rhode Island College alumni
Providence College alumni
1960 births
Living people